Charles W. Adams (1834–1909) was an officer in the Union Army during the American Civil War. He entered the Union Army in 1862 as a Colonel and was given command of the 12th Kansas Volunteer Infantry. He led his unit at the Battle of Jenkins' Ferry where he received a gunshot wound in his arm. He mustered out of Union service in 1865 as a Brevet Brigadier General and returned to Lawrence, Kansas.

He died in Oakland, California on March 8, 1909.

See also
List of American Civil War brevet generals (Union)

References

1834 births
1909 deaths
Union Army colonels
People from Massachusetts
People of Kansas in the American Civil War
People from Lawrence, Kansas